Petit-Didier is a French surname that may refer to
Jacques Petit-Didier, French Olympic bobsledder
Matthieu Petit-Didier (1659–1728), French theologian and historian
Roger Petit-Didier, French Olympic bobsledder

See also
Petit (disambiguation)
Didier

French-language surnames